Sewon Okazawa (born 21 December 1995) is a Japanese boxer. He competed in the men's welterweight event at the 2020 Summer Olympics.

He was born in Yamagata, Japan to a Ghanaian father and a Japanese mother.

References

External links
 

1995 births
Living people
Japanese male boxers
Olympic boxers of Japan
Boxers at the 2020 Summer Olympics
Japanese people of Ghanaian descent
Sportspeople of Ghanaian descent
Sportspeople from Yamagata Prefecture
Southpaw boxers
21st-century Japanese people